Broadview Historical Museum in Broadview, Saskatchewan, Canada, is one of "one of the largest small town museums" on the Canadian prairies. It opened on July 15, 1972.

Features

It features the Highland One Room Schoolhouse a 1913 Canadian Pacific Railway Caboose, a reconstructed sod house, the Delorme family's one-room log cabin, extensive indoor and outdoor installations of numerous Cree and settler archives, artifacts and war memorabilia, including 'Sergeant Bill'—"Saskatchewan's most famous goat". Archival photos and documents include agricultural, military, settler, and Cree history and heritage including genealogical resources.

Delorme House
 

The Delorme House is a 12 by 16 foot one-room log cabin which was home to a family of five in the early 20th century.

Sergeant Bill

During World War I the 5th Battalion, CEF adopted a goat from Broadview as their mascot, bringing it with them to France and back.

Accreditation
The museum is a member of the Museums Association of Saskatchewan and the Canadian Museum Association.

References

 Museums Association of Saskatchewan

History museums in Saskatchewan